Dickinson is an unincorporated community in Clarke County, Alabama, United States. Dickinson is the hometown of Tom Franklin, a crime fiction writer.

Geography

References

Unincorporated communities in Alabama
Unincorporated communities in Clarke County, Alabama